The starry bent-toed gecko (Cyrtodactylus astrum) is a species of gecko endemic to southern Thailand and peninsular Malaysia. The epithet (astrum) references the star-like pattern formed by the white tubercules present on the gecko's back. It is found in lowland forests.

References

Cyrtodactylus
Reptiles described in 2012